Qasımağalı (also Gasymaghaly) is a village in the Gadabay District of Azerbaijan. The village forms part of the municipality of Isaly.

The main occupation of the population is agriculture-farming, livestock and animal husbandry.

The name Kasimagali means belonging to Gasim Agha.

References 

Populated places in Gadabay District